Reilly Ridge is a prominent rock ridge about 7 nautical miles (13 km) long on the northeast side of Lanterman Range, Bowers Mountains, Antarctica. The ridge descends from the heights just east of Mount Bernstein and forms a part of the southwest wall of Sledgers Glacier. Mapped by United States Geological Survey (USGS) from ground surveys and U.S. Navy air photos, 1960–62. Named by Advisory Committee on Antarctic Names (US-ACAN) for Commander Joseph L. Reilly, U.S. Navy, officer in charge of the winter support party at McMurdo Station. 1964.

Further reading 
 Gunter Faure, Teresa M. Mensing, The Transantarctic Mountains: Rocks, Ice, Meteorites and Water, P 120
 Edmund Stump, The Ross Orogen of the Transantarctic Mountains, PP 58 - 60

External links

 Reilly Ridge on USGS website
 Reilly Ridge on AADC website
 Reilly Ridge on SCAR website
 Reilly Ridge updated weather forecast

References 

Ridges of Victoria Land
Pennell Coast